Al-Qudsi (Arabic: القدسي) is a surname. Notable people with the name include:

 Adli Qudsi, Syrian architect 

 Kamil Pasha al-Qudsi, former Governor General of the State of Aleppo

 Nazim al-Qudsi, former president of Syria 
 Safwan al-Qudsi, Syrian politician

Al-Qudsi family
Syrian families
Political families of Syria
Arabic-language surnames